Barney Russell (11 August 1890 – 13 July 1961) was an Australian cricketer. He played three first-class matches for New South Wales between 1920/21 and 1921/22.

See also
 List of New South Wales representative cricketers

References

External links
 

1890 births
1961 deaths
Australian cricketers
New South Wales cricketers
Cricketers from Sydney